Operation Castor was a French airborne operation in the First Indochina War. The operation established a fortified airhead in Điện Biên Province, in the north-west corner of Vietnam and was commanded by Brigadier General Jean Gilles. The Operation began at 10:35 on 20 November 1953, with reinforcements dropped over the following two days. With all its objectives achieved, the operation ended on 22 November. Castor was the largest airborne operation since World War II.

Execution
The French paratroopers of the 6ème Bataillon de Parachutistes Coloniaux (6 BPC) and the 2nd Battalion of the 1er Régiment de Chasseurs Parachutistes (II/1er RCP) dropped over Dien Bien Phu on the first day in order to secure the airstrip built by the Japanese during the occupation of French Indochina by Japan from 1940 to 1945. The operation took 65 of the 70 operational C-47 Dakota and all 12 C-119 Flying Boxcar transport aircraft the French had in the area, and still required two trips to get the lead elements into the valley. Also dropped in the first wave were elements of the 17e Régiment de Génie Parachutiste (RGP) ("17th Airborne Engineers Regiment") and the Headquarters group of Groupement Aéroporté 1 (GAP 1), ("Airborne Group 1"). They were followed later in the afternoon by the 1er Bataillon de Parachutistes Coloniaux (1 BPC) and elements of 35e Régiment d'Artillerie Légère Parachutiste (35 RALP) and other combat support elements. Just after its landing, the 6 BPC ran into contact with the Việt Minh 910th Battalion, 148th Regiment, which was conducting field exercise in the area along with a battery from the 351st Artillery Division and an infantry company of the 320th Division. Fighting persisted until afternoon when the Việt Minh units eventually withdrew to the south.

The following day, the second airborne group, "GAP 2" – consisting of 1er Bataillon Etranger de Parachutistes (1 BEP), 8e Bataillon de Parachutistes de Choc (8 BPC), other combat support elements and the entire command and Headquarters group for the Dien Bien Phu operation under Brigadier General Jean Gilles – was dropped in. While on another drop zone, the heavy equipment came down and the engineers quickly set about repairing and lengthening the airstrip.

On 22 November, the last troops of the initial garrison, the 5e Bataillon de Parachutistes Vietnamiens ("Battalion of Vietnamese Parachutists", 5 BPVN), jumped into the valley. In the same "stick" as the commander of 5 BPVN was Brigitte Friang, a woman war correspondent with a military parachutist diploma, and five combat jumps. These troops raised the Dien Bien Phu garrison to its full planned strength of 4,500. On November 30, orders were issued for the garrison to guarantee free use of the airfield, to hold the position to the last man, and to conduct attacks to retard buildups of Viet Minh forces. General Navarre created the outpost to draw the Việt Minh into fighting a pitched battle. That battle, the Battle of Dien Bien Phu, occurred four months after Operation Castor.

French order of battle

Aeroportable Division Element:
 Groupement Aéroporté 1 (GAP 1), (Airborne Group 1)

GAP 1 Headquarters staff
 1er Bataillon de Parachutistes Coloniaux (1 BPC) (Colonial Parachute Battalion)
 6ème Bataillon de Parachutistes Coloniaux (6 BPC) (Colonial Parachute Battalion)
 2ème Bataillon,  1er Régiment de Chasseurs Parachutistes ("1st Parachute Chasseur Regiment" II/1 RCP) (Light Infantry Parachute Regiment)
 17e Régiment de Génie Parachutiste (RGP) (17th Airborne Engineers Regiment)
 35e Régiment d'Artillerie Légère Parachutistes (35 RALP) (35th Light Artillery Parachute Regiment)
 Groupement Aéroporté 2 (GAP 2), (Airborne Group 2)
  1er Bataillon Etranger de Parachutistes (1 B.E.P) (Foreign Parachute Battalion)
 8e Bataillon de Parachutistes de Choc (8 B.P.C) (Parachute Assault Battalion)
 5e Bataillon de Parachutistes Vietnamiens (5 B.P.V.N) (Vietnamese Parachute Battalion)
 1st Foreign Parachute Heavy Mortar Company

References

Notes

Sources
 Chen Jian. 1993. "China and the First Indo-China War, 1950–54", The China Quarterly, No. 133. (Mar., 1993), pp 85–110. London: School of Oriental and African Studies.
 Cogan, Charles G. 2000. "L'attitude des États-Unis à l'égard de la guerre d'Indochine" in Vaïsse (2000: 51–88).
 Davidson, Phillip. 1988. Vietnam at War: The History, 1946–1975. New York: Oxford University Press. 
 
 Fall, Bernard. 2005. Street Without Joy. Barnsley: Pen & Sword Military. 
 Farrell, Ryan F. 1991. "Airlift's role at Dien Bien Phu and Khe Sanh". Global Security website. Retrieved: February 19, 2008.
 Friang, Brigitte. 1958. Parachutes and Petticoats. London: Jarrolds.
 Giap, Vo Nguyen. 1971. The Military Art of People's War. New York & London: Modern Reader. 
 Navarre, Henri. 1956. Agonie de l'Indochine. Paris: Librairie Plon. 
 Simpson, Howard R. 1994. Dien Bien Phu: The Epic Battle America Forgot. London: Brassey's. 
 Vaïsse, Maurice (editor). 2000. L'Armée française dans la guerre d'Indochine (1946–1954). Paris: Editions Complexe.
 Windrow, Martin. 1998. The French Indochina War, 1946–1954, Osprey. 
 Windrow, Martin. 2004. The Last Valley. Weidenfeld and Nicolson.

External links
 Operation Castor at DienBienPhu.org
 French ambassador honors U.S. pilots at Castor and Dien Bien Phu, Feb. 25, 2005

Battles and operations of the First Indochina War
1953 in French Indochina
1953 in Vietnam
Battles involving Vietnam
Military operations involving France
November 1953 events in Asia
History of Điện Biên Province